

Events

February events
 February 18 – The West Chester Railroad is chartered in Pennsylvania.

April events
 April 23 – the Pontchartrain Rail-Road begins operation. 
 April 25
 Matthias W. Baldwin displays a model steam locomotive at the Philadelphia City Museum a year before building his first full-size locomotive for a working railroad.
 The New York and Harlem Railroad is incorporated as a passenger carrier.

May events
 May – Members of a Manchester (England) Sunday School are conveyed by a special train on the Liverpool and Manchester Railway to Liverpool, the first recorded private railway excursion.

June events
 June 17 - The first boiler explosion in the United States occurs when the engineer on the Best Friend of Charleston ties the steam safety pressure release valve shut.
 June 18 – The John Bull is constructed by Robert Stephenson and Company in England.
 June 21 – The Boston and Providence Rail Road is incorporated and chartered to build a railroad connection between Boston, Massachusetts, and Providence, Rhode Island.
 June 23 – The Boston and Worcester Railroad is chartered to build a railroad between its namesake cities in Massachusetts.

July events
 July 1 – The first railroad built in Virginia, the Chesterfield Railroad, begins operations.
 July 4 – Opening of first section of Edinburgh and Dalkeith Railway in Scotland including St Leonards Tunnel, Scotland's earliest tunnel on a public railway.

 July 14 – The John Bull departs Liverpool aboard the steamship Allegheny bound for Philadelphia, Pennsylvania.

August events 
 August 9 – The Mohawk and Hudson Railroad, the first railroad built in New York state, opens.

September events
 September 4 – The John Bull arrives in Philadelphia, Pennsylvania from Liverpool.
 September 15 – The John Bull is operated for the first time on the Camden and Amboy Railroad.
 September 24 – The Mohawk and Hudson Railroad opens between Albany and Schenectady, New York.

November events
 November 12 – Robert L. Stevens, president of the Camden and Amboy Railroad hosts a demonstration run of the John Bull for New Jersey politicians and dignitaries.

Unknown date events
 First rail carriage of United States mail, by South Carolina Canal and Rail Road Company, according to some sources.
 John B. Jervis becomes the chief engineer for the Mohawk and Hudson Railroad, a predecessor of the New York Central.

Births

January births 
 January 14 – William D. Washburn, first president of Soo Line Railroad 1883–1889, is born (d. 1912).

March births
 March 3 – George Pullman, American inventor and industrialist, founder of the Pullman Company (d. 1897)

August births 
 August 26 – T. Jefferson Coolidge, president of Atchison, Topeka and Santa Fe Railway 1880–1881 (d. 1920).

Unknown date births
 Eli H. Janney, inventor of the knuckle coupler (d. 1912).

Deaths

References